Ehretia acuminata is a deciduous tree found in Japan, China, Bhutan, Nepal, Laos, Vietnam, New Guinea and Australia. Fossil evidence suggests an ancient Laurasian origin.  This group of plants spread to Australia and South America via Africa, when these continents were still joined.

Commonly known as Koda in Australia, Ehretia acuminata is a common tree found from near Bega in south east New South Wales to Cape York in far north eastern Australia. The Australian habitat are different forms of rainforest, particularly near the margins or in disturbed areas.

Description 
Ehretia acuminata is a medium to large size tree, occasionally reaching 30 metres in height and a 90 cm in trunk diameter.

The bark is of a creamy grey colour, with vertical fissures. Koda is often easily identified in winter as being deciduous and of the characteristic flutings at the base of the trunk.

Leaves, flowers and fruit 

The leaves are alternate and simple, tapering to a tip, finely toothed, 8 to 13 cm long. Smooth and green on both surfaces slightly hairy above. The midrib and lateral veins are distinct on both sides of the leaf, raised beneath.

Flowers are white, sweetly scented, in panicles. Individual flowers are without a stalk, about 4 mm in diameter. Flowers appear in September to November in the southern hemisphere.

The fruit matures from January to April in Australia, in China in September, being a yellow or orange drupe, 4 to 5 mm in diameter,
containing four seeds. The fruit is edible to humans with a sweet taste. Fruit are eaten by many rainforest birds, including the Lewin's honeyeater, rose-crowned fruit-dove, brown cuckoo dove, wompoo fruit dove and Australasian figbird.

Seed germination is relatively easy. Ensure the flesh is removed from the fruit, and expect rapid germination.

Commercial use 
Ehretia acuminata is used for roadside plantings, building and furniture timber, as well as in Traditional Chinese medicine.

References

Further reading
 Floyd, A.G., Rainforest Trees of Mainland South-eastern Australia, Inkata Press 1989,

External links
 acuminata @ eFloras.org

acuminata
Trees of Australia
Flora of New South Wales
Flora of Queensland
Trees of Japan
Trees of China
Trees of Taiwan
Asterids of Australia
Trees of Laos
Trees of Vietnam
Trees of Bhutan
Trees of Nepal
Japanese fruit